Dyrøy Church is a parish church of the Church of Norway in Dyrøy Municipality in Troms og Finnmark county, Norway. It is located in the village of Holm on the eastern shore of the island of Dyrøya. It is one of the churches for the Dyrøy parish which is part of the Senja prosti (deanery) in the Diocese of Nord-Hålogaland. The white, wooden church was built in a long church style in 1880 using plans drawn up by the architect Håkon Mosling. The church seats about 450 people.

History
The earliest existing historical records of the church date back to the year 1589, but the church was likely built around the year 1500. During an inspection in August 1770, the old church was described as a timber-framed building with a cruciform floor plan with a sod roof. It also had a tower, choir, and sacristy. It had a graveyard surrounding the church. At that time, the inspectors found that the church was "miserable and dilapidated" and they recommended a new church be constructed. In 1770, the graveyard was closed. In 1777, a new church was built at Holm about  further north along the coast of the island. The new building was also a cruciform design and it was consecrated on 9 November 1777. The red church had a small tower and two entrances. In 1778, the old church was auctioned off to Nils Peterson and Jørgen Hansen who took it down and reused its materials.

The new building had a tower on the west end. After the new church was in use, the old church was torn down. The cemetery by the old church is still in use, a short distance from the new church building.

Media gallery

See also
List of churches in Nord-Hålogaland

References

Dyrøy
Churches in Troms
Wooden churches in Norway
19th-century Church of Norway church buildings
Churches completed in 1880
16th-century establishments in Norway
Long churches in Norway